Earthling or Earthlings may refer to:

Film and television
 Earthling (film), a 2010 sci-fi film
 Earthlings (film), a 2005 animal rights documentary
 The Earthling, a 1980 drama film 
 "Earthling" (Fringe), a 2009 TV episode 
 "Earthlings" (Steven Universe), a 2016 TV episode 
 Earthlings, original code-name for The L Word TV series

Music
 Earthling (band), a English trip hop band 
 earthlings?, an American psychedelic rock band 
earthlings? (album), 1998
 The Earthlings, a British acoustic duo
 Earthling (album), by David Bowie, 1997
 Earthling (Eddie Vedder album), 2022 
 Earthlings (album), by Chrome Hill, 2008

Other uses
 Earthling Publications, an American small press
 Earthlings, a 2018 novel by Sayaka Murata

See also 

 Earth (disambiguation)
 Planet Earth (disambiguation)
 Terran (disambiguation)
 Earth in science fiction